Fathi Kameel Matar Marzouq (born 23 May 1955) was a Kuwaiti football player in the late 1970s and early 1980s. He helped Kuwait qualify to the World Cup in 1982 by scoring a goal against New Zealand. Fathi also helped Kuwait win the Asian Cup in 1980. He was joint top-scorer at the 1976 AFC Asian Cup with three goals. He also played for Kuwait at the 1980 Summer Olympics. It is said that Fathi would usually be on the bench (as a secret weapon) and that, whenever he warmed up to play, the crowd cheered him loudly.

References

1955 births
1976 AFC Asian Cup players
1980 AFC Asian Cup players
1982 FIFA World Cup players
AFC Asian Cup-winning players
Kuwaiti footballers
Association football forwards
Living people
Olympic footballers of Kuwait
Footballers at the 1980 Summer Olympics
Asian Games medalists in football
Footballers at the 1982 Asian Games
Asian Games silver medalists for Kuwait
Medalists at the 1982 Asian Games
Kuwait international footballers
Kuwait Premier League players
Al Tadhamon SC players